Daniel Lang (born 11 August 1971) is a Swiss fencer. He competed in the individual épée event at the 1992 Summer Olympics.

References

External links
 

1971 births
Living people
Swiss male épée fencers
Olympic fencers of Switzerland
Fencers at the 1992 Summer Olympics